The Raymond Baronetcy of Valentine House, in the County of Essex, was created in the Baronetage of Great Britain on 31 May 1774 for Charles Raymond, of Valentines, Ilford in Essex, who was High Sheriff of Essex from 1771 to 1772. It was created with remainder to his son-in-law William Burrell (the husband of his daughter Sophia), who succeeded him as second Baronet. The latter was the nephew of the first Burrell baronet of the 1766 creation and the uncle of the first Baron Gwydyr. The third Burrell baronet succeeded to the title of Baronet Raymond of Valentine House on 20 January 1796.

Raymond, later Burrell baronets, of Valentine House (1774)
Sir Charles Raymond, 1st Baronet (1713–1788), a prominent East India Company Captain, and after his retirement from the sea, manager of their voyages.
Sir William Burrell, 2nd Baronet (1732–1796)
Sir Charles Merrik Burrell, 3rd Baronet (1774–1862)
Sir Percy Burrell, 4th Baronet (1812–1876)
Sir Walter Wyndham Burrell, 5th Baronet (1814–1886)
Sir Charles Raymond Burrell, 6th Baronet (1848–1899)
Sir Merrik Raymond Burrell, 7th Baronet (1877–1957)
Sir Walter Raymond Burrell, 8th Baronet (1903–1985)
Sir John Raymond Burrell, 9th Baronet (1934–2008)
Sir Charles Raymond Burrell, 10th Baronet (b. 1962)

The heir apparent is the present holder's only son Edward Lambert Burrell.

See also
Burrell baronets, of West Grinstead Park (1766)
Baron Gwydyr

References

Raymond
Baronetcies created with special remainders
1774 establishments in Great Britain